The Air Force Engineering University (AFEU) is a military university of the People's Liberation Army Air Force (PLAAF), located in Xi'an, the capital of Shaanxi Province, China.  It has 6 colleges with about 8000 students and 700 teachers and professors. The university was established in 1959, and renamed in 1999. It is under the jurisdiction of the Ministry of National Defense.

Department 
College of Aeronautics Engineering (former Air Force Engineering Academy)

College of Air and Missile Defense (former Air Force Missile Academy)

College of Information and Navigation (former Air Force Telecommunication Engineering Academy)

College of Air Traffic Control and Navigation

College of Equipment Management and UAV Engineering

College of Aircraft-Technical Segreants

College of Graduate Students

Department of Basic Education

Department of Military and Political Education

Department of Foreign Cadet Training

See also 
Zhukovsky Air Force Engineering Academy

References

Air force academies
Military education and training in China
People's Liberation Army Air Force
Universities and colleges in Xi'an
Educational institutions established in 1959
1959 establishments in China